Mary Tinetti is an American physician, and Gladys Phillips Crofoot Professor of Medicine and Epidemiology and Public Health at Yale University, and Director of the Yale Program on Aging.

Life
She graduated from the University of Michigan at Ann Arbor with a B.A. in 1973, and from the University of Michigan Medical School with an M.D. in 1978. 
She was a resident at the University of Minnesota.  
She studied on a geriatric fellowship at the University of Rochester with Dr. T. Franklin Williams. 
She pioneered the study of morbidity due to falls by elderly people, and investigated risk-reduction strategies that were both effective and cost-effective.

Awards
2009 MacArthur Fellows Program

Works
 "A Multifactorial Intervention to Reduce the Risk of Falling among Elderly People Living in the Community", The New England Journal of Medicine, Volume 331:821-827, September 29, 1994, Number 13

References

External links
Mary Tinetti, 2009 MacArthur Fellow
"Q&A with 2009 MacArthur Fellow Mary E. Tinetti, MD, from New Haven, CT.", Gerontology Society of America

Living people
Year of birth missing (living people)
Yale University faculty
MacArthur Fellows
American geriatricians
Women geriatricians
University of Michigan Medical School alumni
Members of the National Academy of Medicine